The 2017–18 Telekom Baskets Bonn season was the 26th season of the German basketball club. The team will play in the Basketball Bundesliga and in the Basketball Champions League this season. Bonn reached the quarter-finals of the BBL Playoffs where it was eliminated 0–3 by Brose Bamberg.

Club

Technical staff

Kit
Supplier: Spalding / Sponsor: Telekom

Roster

Transactions

Players in

Total spending:  €0

Players out

Total spending:  €0

References

External links
Official website

Telekom Baskets Bonn
2017–18 in German basketball
2017–18 in European basketball by club